The 2007 AFC President's Cup was the third edition of the AFC President's Cup, a competition for football clubs in countries categorized as "emerging nations" by the Asian Football Confederation. The eight teams that competed were split up into two groups and play each other team in their group once. The winner of each group then played the runner up in the other group in the semi-finals, and the winners of the semi-final matches played in the final match to determine the winner. There was no third place match. Games were played in Lahore, Pakistan, between 20 and 30 September 2007.

Venues

Qualifying teams

Group stage

Group A

Group B

Knockout stage

Semi-finals

Final

OFFICIALS
Linesman: Md. Abdul Sarker (Bangladesh)
Linesman: Jeffrey Goh (Singapore)

See also
2007 AFC Cup
2007 AFC Champions League

References

External links
 AFC President's Cup 2007

2007 in Asian football
2007
2007
2007 in Bhutanese football
2007 in Cambodian football
2007 in Taiwanese football
2007 in Kyrgyzstani football
2007 in Tajikistani football
2007–08 in Sri Lankan football
2007–08 in Pakistani football
2007 in Nepalese sport